Majena, also known as Majiena or Maxiena, is an unclassified, now-extinct language, originally spoken by the alleged Ticomeri people of the Llanos de Mojos plains in northwestern Bolivia. Nothing is known about the language itself, but sources state that it was unintelligible to speakers of the nearby Arawakan languages Moxo and Baure (the term "Ticomeri" is a Moxo exonym meaning "other-language") and possibly unrelated to any languages of the area. It may therefore have been a language isolate.

Speakers of the language were identified in the mission settlement of San Borja in the eighteenth century. There is some confusion between the Majena-speaking Ticomeri and another group, also known as "Ticomeri", who spoke a divergent dialect of Moxo. Whether the two groups were related (i.e. whether the Ticomeri had abandoned Majena and acquired Moxo) is unknowable, since both were apparently extinct by 1805.

References

Sources

Languages of Bolivia
Unclassified languages of South America
Unattested languages of South America
Extinct languages of South America